Riaan van Zyl (born July 9, 1972) is an American former rugby union player. He played wing for the United States national team from 2003 to 2004. In that short span, he earned 13 caps including 12 starts, and scored 9 tries. He started all four matches for the US during the 2003 Rugby World Cup where he scored 2 tries.

References

1972 births
Living people
American rugby union players
South Africa international rugby sevens players
United States international rugby union players